Pascal Wiberg Gregor (born 18 February 1994) is a Danish professional footballer who plays  for Danish Superliga club Lyngby Boldklub as a centre-back.

Career

Nordsjælland
A centre-back, Gregor joined the FC Nordsjælland academy in 2011 from Vanløse IF. In 2013, he captained their under-19 side, winning gold in the under-19 league. Gregor was also announced as Talent of the Year in FC Nordsjælland in 2013. The same year, he was promoted to the first-team in order to replace Jores Okore who had signed with Aston Villa. In December 2013, his good performances were rewarded with a four-year contract extension.

Upon his contract expiring, Gregor refused to sign a contract extension, making him a free agent in January 2018.

Helsingør
On 4 January 2018, Gregor signed a two-year contract with FC Helsingør. He made his debut for the club on 11 February as a starter in a 6–1 away loss to OB. Gregor made 45 total appearances for Helsingør in which he scored four goals.

Loan to Haugesund
On 2 August 2019, Gregor joined Norwegian club FK Haugesund on loan for the remainder of 2019. He made his debut for the club on 4 August, coming on as a first-half substitute for the injured Fredrik Pallesen Knudsen in a 1–1 away draw against Stabæk. Gregor scored his first goal for Haugesund on 20 October, scoring on a header in a 3–1 loss to Molde. He ended his tenure with the Norwegian club with one goal in seven appearances, as he struggled to break into the team.

Lyngby
On 19 December 2019, Lyngby Boldklub confirmed that Gregor would join the club January 2020 on a three-year contract. Upon his return to Denmark, he made his first appearance for the club on 17 February 2020, as a starter in a 2–0 away loss to FC Midtjylland. He suffered relegation to the Danish 1st Division with the club on 9 May 2021 after a loss to last placed AC Horsens.

Gregor scored his first goal for the club on 18 March 2022, heading in a cross from Magnus Kaastrup to secure a final 3–0 score in the away match against Esbjerg fB in the 1st Division.

Career statistics

References

External links

Living people
1994 births
Association football central defenders
Danish men's footballers
Danish expatriate men's footballers
FC Nordsjælland players
FC Helsingør players
FK Haugesund players
Lyngby Boldklub players
Danish Superliga players
Danish 1st Division players
Eliteserien players
Denmark under-21 international footballers
Denmark youth international footballers
Footballers at the 2016 Summer Olympics
Olympic footballers of Denmark
Danish expatriate sportspeople in Norway
Expatriate footballers in Norway
Vanløse IF players
Footballers from Copenhagen